Charles Jeremy "Chaz" Jankel (born 16 April 1952) is an English musician. In a music career spanning more than 40 years, he came to prominence in the late 1970s as the guitarist and keyboardist of the rock band Ian Dury and the Blockheads. With Dury, Jankel co-wrote some of the band's best-known songs including "Sex & Drugs & Rock & Roll", "Hit Me with Your Rhythm Stick" and "Reasons to Be Cheerful, Part 3".

In addition to his work with the Blockheads, Jankel has had a solo career which has resulted in nine studio albums. He has a long list of credits as both a performer and as songwriter.

Early life
Charles Jeremy Jankel was born on 16 April 1952 in Stanmore, Middlesex. Inspired by skiffle singer Lonnie Donegan, he started to learn how to play the Spanish guitar at age 7, and then went on to study the piano. He attended the boarding school Mill Hill School and became a fan of the American rock, funk and soul band Sly and the Family Stone during his time there. Jankel's fondness for this style was later responsible for much of the funk influence on the Blockheads' music and also influenced Jankel's solo career. As a student at the art college Saint Martin's School of Art he played with a folk rock band called Byzantium from 1972 to 1973.

Career
In 1973, Jankel contributed a track titled "Let's Go" to Long John Baldry's studio album Good to Be Alive. He then joined the folk rock band Jonathan Kelly's Outside and worked on their only studio album ...Waiting on You, released in early 1974. Jankel first started working with Ian Dury as part of the pub rock band Kilburn and the High Roads in the early part of the 1970s. He went on to work with Dury on albums such as 1977's New Boots and Panties!! and the Blockheads' albums including the 1979 release Do It Yourself before leaving the band. He wrote funk songs such as "Hit Me with your Rhythm Stick", and "Sex & Drugs & Rock & Roll". In 1981, Jankel joined Dury again, without the Blockheads, for his second solo studio album Lord Upminster, which spawned the US Top 40 dance hit "Spasticus Autisticus", which he co-wrote.

After leaving the Blockheads, Jankel pursued a solo career and issued four studio albums for A&M, including his 1980 self-titled debut and 1981's Chasanova, which was also released under the title Questionnaire. This album featured major lyrical contributions from Ian Dury, and musical contributions from two of the Blockheads, bassist Norman Watt-Roy, and drummer Charlie Charles and also contained the US dance hit "Glad to Know You", which was one of the tracks with lyrics written by Dury, plus the MTV music video of its title track. In 1981, Quincy Jones had a UK chart hit with a cover version of Jankel's "Ai No Corrida", which reached No. 14 in April of that year. The song was also covered by the Nylons, and Laura More with Uniting Nations. In 2005, the Uniting Nations' version peaked at No. 18 in the UK.

Jankel hit No. 1 on the Hot Dance Music/Club Play chart in 1982 with the triple A-side "Glad to Know You"/"3,000,000 Synths"/"Ai No Corrida". His single "Number One" went to No. 1 in the clubs in France and was used in the 1985 film Real Genius. He went on to release the studio albums Chazablanca in 1983 and Looking at You in 1985. In 1985 Jerry Moss, the recording executive of A&M, rejected the release of his fifth album, and terminated his recording career with the label.

After both of Jankel's parents died, he moved to the US in 1988 and lived there for several years before returning to the UK to rejoin the Blockheads, working with Dury on their final two studio albums with him: Mr. Love Pants (1998), and Ten More Turnips from the Tip (2000) on which later album he took lead vocals on the song "I Could Lie". After Dury's death in 2000, Jankel continued to write and perform with the Blockheads, with Dury's former friend and minder Derek Hussey being Dury's replacement.

Jankel has several composer credits for films, including DOA (1988), which was co-directed by his sister Annabel Jankel, and K2 (1991). Jankel composed the majority of the music for the Dury biopic Sex & Drugs & Rock & Roll (2010), in which he was portrayed by Tom Hughes. Jankel received a BAFTA nomination for the film's music.

In 2010, Jankel released his first compilation album titled My Occupation – The Music of Chaz Jankel which included the songs "Ai No Corrida", "Glad to Know You" and "You're My Occupation". This album also contained the additional song "Get Myself Together" 

Since 2001 Jankel had issued records on his own CJ Records label. Jankel recorded a single with Cherry Cameron in 2016.

Personal life
Jankel moved to Venice, Los Angeles in September 1988. He lived with his Swedish girlfriend Catharina Hemberg. They were married on the island of Kauai.

Chaz and Catharina have a son,born in Hollywood in 1990 Tao Hemberg Jankel who lives and works these days  in Oslo,Norway.He also is a successful DJ.When Tao was  very young Catharina and Chaz divorced, she moving back to Sweden and he moving back to the UK in 1992, where he met his future wife, the artist Elaine O'Halloran. They had met on the set of the film The Rachel Papers (1989) where she was assistant editor. The couple have a son Lewis Shay Jankel (b. 1993), a DJ, record producer, singer and songwriter who uses the stage name Shift K3Y.

His sister Annabel Jankel is a film and television director who, in 2018, directed the British film drama Tell It to the Bees; Jankel wrote a piano piece called "Unresolved" that features in the soundtrack.

Discography

Solo albums

Singles

References

Further reading
Guinness Book of British Hit Singles 7th Edition – 1988

External links
Official website

1952 births
20th-century English singers
21st-century English singers
20th-century British guitarists
21st-century British guitarists
20th-century multi-instrumentalists
21st-century multi-instrumentalists
A&M Records artists
Alumni of Saint Martin's School of Art
Jewish English musicians
English film score composers
English male film score composers
English rock guitarists
English male guitarists
English rock keyboardists
English multi-instrumentalists
English new wave musicians
English rock pianists
English record producers
English songwriters
English tenors
Lead guitarists
Living people
Musicians from London
People educated at Mill Hill School
People from Stanmore
Polydor Records artists
Singers from London
Stiff Records artists
The Blockheads members
British male pianists
21st-century pianists
20th-century British male singers
21st-century British male singers
Varèse Sarabande Records artists
British male songwriters